Ava is a 2017 French drama film directed by Léa Mysius. It was screened in the International Critics' Week section at the 2017 Cannes Film Festival. At Cannes it won the SACD Award.

Plot
Ava is unhappy 13-year-old, who is losing her sight from Retinitis Pigmentosa – a genetic condition which leads to her losing her night sight, then her peripheral vision, followed by total blindness. She is determined to live life to the full while she can see, exploring her approaching blindness and her constant nightmares which keep her awake at night.

She is attracted to an 18-year-old, Juan and his dog, who she names Lupo. Juan is a traveler in love with Jessica, over whom he fights but is stabbed. Ava comes across the wounded Juan, helping him to recover. Once he is better, they embark on a spree of robberies at the beach, helping Ava to cope with her sadness. This, and the fact that Juan is having sex with Ava, gets Juan into trouble with the police.

They escape from the police and Ava offers to help Juan recover his car keys and papers from his caravan so they can run away together. Ava joins Jessica's wedding on the traveler site to wait tables, then slips away when the cake is served. She finds Juan's wallet and driving license but can't find his car keys.

The police raid the wedding so that Juan and Ava are forced to run away without his car. While they are walking away, Jessica appears to give Juan his car, leaving her veil with Ava as a token of her love and support for the couple.

Cast
 Noée Abita as Ava
 Laure Calamy as Maud, Ava's mother
 Juan Cano as Juan
 Tamara Cano as Jessica
 Carmen Gimenez as Carmen
 Daouda Diakhaté as Tété

Production
In a dreamy scene, Laure Calamy appears  on a counter with her legs spread. It was the actress herself who suggested to director Léa Mysius that "we see a little more than the pubic hair, that the vulva is showed."

Reception 

On Rotten Tomatoes, the film has an aggregated score of 84% based on 16 positive and 3 negative critic reviews.

References

External links
 

2017 films
2017 drama films
2017 directorial debut films
French drama films
2010s French-language films
2010s French films